Tsinghua University is a major research university in Beijing, China.

Tsinghua may also refer to:

 National Tsing Hua University, Taiwan
 Tsinghua Garden, Beijing, China
 Tsinghua Holdings
 Tsinghua International School
 Tsinghua Big Five Alliance